Information Technology in Sri Lanka refers to  business process outsourcing, knowledge process outsourcing, software development, IT Services , and IT education in Sri Lanka. Sri Lanka is always ranked among the top 50 outsourcing destinations by AT Kearney, and Colombo and ranked among "Top 20 Emerging Cities" by Global Services Magazine. The export revenue of this industry grew from USD 213 million in 2007 to USD 1089 million in 2019.

History
For the purpose of developing IT in Sri Lanka, Computer Society of Sri Lanka was started in 1976. Sri Lanka's IT, KPO/BPO industry has a short span of history starting around 2000. IT/BPO sector has been identified as a priority sector for economic development in the country.

Business process outsourcing
Sri Lanka is an offshore development center and Joint venture hub for several Fortune 500 companies from North America, UK, Australia, Sweden, Norway and Japan. Well known customers of Sri Lankan BPO industry include Google, J.P. Morgan & Co, Microsoft, Emirates , Infor and Qatar Airways.

Rankings

Government Bodies
The prominent government body related to IT in Sri Lanka is the Ministry of Technology. Other than that Ministries of Education, Skills development are working on developing the education while Ministry of Industry and Commerce is on industrial level activities.

Revenue Statistics

Legislation
IT in Sri Lanka is governed under the Information and Communication Technology Act No. 27 of 2003.

Other Related Acts 
 Electronic Transactions Act, No. 19 OF 2006
 National Digital Policy for Sri Lanka
 Data Protection Bill
 Telecommunication Levy Act, No. 21 OF 2011
 Telecommunication Levy Act(Amendment) Act, No. 8 OF 2013

Agencies
 The Information and Communication Technology Agency (Sri Lanka)
 Sri Lanka Computer Emergency Readiness Team (SLCERT)
 Telecommunications Regulatory Commission of Sri Lanka  (TRCSL)

Organisations
 Sri Lanka Association of Software and Service Companies (SLASSCOM) similar to India's NASSCOM is another agency working on the development of business, education and employment.

 The Federation of Information Technology Industry Sri Lanka (FITIS)
 The ICT Industry Skills Council (ICTISC)

Recent development
There are many global IT services companies established in Sri Lanka such as HSBC, IFS, Intel, Motorola, WNS,RR Donnelley, Virtusa, Pearsons and Accenture.

IT parks

Sri Lanka has few government owned and privately managed IT Parks.

Orion City IT Park established in 2009 is a privately owned IT park situated in Dematagoda area in Colombo. The Park is spread over 16 acres and currently has 800,000 sq feet of developed space. Currently this park houses, Virtusa, IFS AB, WNS Global Services and several other IT and non-IT companies.

In 2011 a full featured IT park was proposed to be built at Hambantota as a government project. In 2012 this project was approved by the Cabinet.

TRACE Expert City is a similar project, developed by the Urban Development Authority, working with the Ministry of Defense. It is situated in Maradana.

In February 2016 India’s External Affairs Minister Sushma Swaraj announced that they are offering an IT park for Sri Lanka considering the IT industry's importance in the country.

Employment
According to the National ICT workforce Survey 2013, the positive domestic developments and gradual recovery of the global economic situation have created a conducive environment for growth of the industry’s workforce and the projection figure shows that this trend is likely to continue. The overall workforce has grown to 75,107 in 2013 with a projection. In 2013, 63% of the workforce held graduate or post-graduate level qualifications. 

The IT industry has become one of the largest sectors in producing employment opportunities in Sri Lanka by creating thousands of IT job openings. Notably, many foreign IT companies start production officers in Sri Lanka due to the wide availability high quality skilled resources and relatively low operational costs.

IT education

Secondary Education
In the national level curriculum, first computer related subject taught at public schools is Information and Communication Technology. This is an elective subject for GCE Ordinary Level in Sri Lanka. For GCE Advanced Level in Sri Lanka a compulsory subject and an exam called General Information Technology was introduced considering the need of IT literacy for every student. Under the technology stream introduced for GCE Advanced Level in past years a new main subject for IT, Information and Communication Technology is added.

Higher Education
With the rapid development of IT industry and increasing job demand in the 1990s, steps were taken by both government and private sector to improve the IT education across the country.

Criticism

CEPA Controversy
In 2016 January, the Sri Lankan government announced that Indo-Sri Lankan Comprehensive Economic Partnership Agreement between India and Sri Lanka will be finalized. It is assumed that Sri Lankan IT industry's job market will be opened to Indians by this agreement causing unemployment among Sri Lankans.

Future
Sri Lanka's IT industry's goal is to achieve USD 5 billion in exports by 2022 while creating 200,000 jobs and uplifting 1,000 tech start-ups.

See also
Economy of Sri Lanka
Knowledge economy
Outsourcing
Sri Lanka Institute of Information Technology

References